Chilavert may refer to:
Martiniano Chilavert, 19th century Argentinian military officer
José Luis Chilavert, Paraguayan footballer
Rolando Chilavert, Paraguayan footballer
Chilavert, Buenos Aires, neighborhood in Buenos Aires, Argentina
Cooperativa Chilavert Artes Gráficas a prominent "recovered factory" in Buenos Aires, Argentina